Pauwels Sauzen–Vastgoedservice was a Belgian UCI Continental team founded in 2014, which disbanded after the 2019 season after merging with . It participated in UCI Continental Circuits races.

Team roster

Major wins
2014
Grand Prix Criquielion, Kevin Peeters
Memorial Philippe Van Coningsloo, Rob Ruijgh

References

UCI Continental Teams (Europe)
Cycling teams based in Belgium
Cycling teams established in 2014
2014 establishments in Belgium
Defunct cycling teams based in Belgium